The Whitesand River is a tributary of the Assiniboine River and finds its headwaters at Whitesand Lake near Invermay in east-central Saskatchewan. Its mouth can be found at its confluence with the Assiniboine River near Kamsack.

Tributaries 
The following is a list of tributaries of the Whitesand River from the upper to lower watershed
Ebel Creek
Lawrie Creek
Yorkton Creek, known as the Little Whitesand River before the year 2000
Crescent Creek
Willow Brook
Cussed Creek
Wallace Creek
Spirit Creek, via a channel from Good Spirit Lake
Crooked Hill Creek

Parks and recreation 
Whitesand River Recreation Site is a reserve and conservation area along the banks of the Whitesand River.

Whitesand Regional Park, which is part of Saskatchewan's Regional Park system, is located just off the Yellowhead Highway at Theodore on the shore of Theodore Reservoir.

Dams and bridges 
Theodore Reservoir was created when the Theodore Dam was built in 1964. It is located at 19-28-6 W2.
Canora Weir is located near the town of Canora.

Communities 
Invermay, Saskatchewan
Yorkton, Saskatchewan
Canora, Saskatchewan
Theodore, Saskatchewan
Springside, Saskatchewan

Fish species 
Fishing commonly found in the river include northern pike and carp.

See also 
List of rivers of Saskatchewan
Hudson Bay drainage basin

References

External links 

Traveling Luck's page about the Whitesand River

Rivers of Saskatchewan
Invermay No. 305, Saskatchewan
Tributaries of the Assiniboine River
Tributaries of Hudson Bay